Conus huttoni is a fossil species of sea snail, a marine gastropod mollusk in the family Conidae, the cone snails, cone shells or cones.

Description

Distribution
This marine species occurs as a fossil in the Early Miocene off New Zealand, where it occurs in Altonian-aged marine strata, comparable in age to the Aquitanian stage.

References

 Maxwell, P.A. (2009). Cenozoic Mollusca. pp 232–254 in Gordon, D.P. (ed.) New Zealand inventory of biodiversity. Volume one. Kingdom Animalia: Radiata, Lophotrochozoa, Deuterostomia. Canterbury University Press, Christchurch.

External links
 To World Register of Marine Species

huttoni
Gastropods described in 1890
Miocene gastropods
Extinct animals of New Zealand